The Hong Kong ATP Challenger is a tennis tournament held in Hong Kong since 2015. The event is part of the ATP Challenger Tour and is played on outdoor hard courts.

This was the first time since 1999 that a Challenger event was held in Hong Kong. This was also the highest-level professional men’s tennis tournament held in Hong Kong since the final edition of the Hong Kong Open (a defunct ATP Tour-level event) in 2002.

Past finals

Singles

Doubles

 
ATP Challenger Tour
Tennis tournaments in Hong Kong
Hard court tennis tournaments